Eucereon rosa is a moth of the subfamily Arctiinae. It was described by Francis Walker in 1854. It is found in Honduras and Paraná, Brazil.

References

 

rosa
Moths described in 1854